Bagumbang is a settlement in Sarawak, Malaysia. Neighboring settlements include:

References

Populated places in Sarawak